Delfines de la UNACAR is a Mexican football club that plays in the Tercera División de México. The club is based in Ciudad del Carmen, Mexico and represents the Universidad Autónoma del Carmen.

See also
Football in Mexico

External links
Official Page

References 

Football clubs in Campeche